Wensley may refer to:

Placename
Wensley, Derbyshire, England
Wensley, North Yorkshire, England

People
Surname
Albert Wensley (1898-1970), English cricketer
Frederick Porter Wensley (1865—1949), British police officer
Olivia Wensley (born 1985), New Zealand lawyer
Penelope Wensley (born 1946), Australian state governor and ambassador

Pseudonym
Shapcott Wensley, pseudonym of the English author and poet Henry Shapcott Bunce (1854–1917)

Given name
Wensley Christoph (born 1984), Surinamese soccer player
Wensley Haydon-Baillie, English businessman
Wensley Pithey (1914-1993), South African character actor